The women's 5000 metres in speed skating at the 1988 Winter Olympics took place on 28 February, at the Olympic Oval. 25 competitors from 15 nations participated in the event.

Records
Prior to this competition, the existing world and Olympic records were as follows:

The following new world and olympic records was set during the competition.

Results

References

Women's speed skating at the 1988 Winter Olympics
Olymp
Skat